The Fonte River is a river in the United States territory of Guam. The NRHP-listed Fonte River Dam is located in its upper reaches, south of Nimitz Hill Annex.

See also
List of rivers of Guam

References

Rivers of Guam
Asan-Maina, Guam